St. George is an unincorporated community in West Newton Township, Nicollet County, Minnesota, United States, near New Ulm.  The community is located near the junction of Nicollet County Roads 5 and 16.

A post office called Saint George was established in 1894, and remained in operation until 1904.

References

Unincorporated communities in Nicollet County, Minnesota
Unincorporated communities in Minnesota